The 1999 All-Ireland Senior Ladies' Football Championship Final was the 26th All-Ireland Final and the deciding match of the 1999 All-Ireland Senior Ladies' Football Championship, an inter-county ladies' Gaelic football tournament for the top teams in Ireland.

References

!
All-Ireland Senior Ladies' Football Championship Finals
All-Ireland
Mayo county ladies' football team matches
Waterford county ladies' football team matches